Hofreistæ is a lake in the municipality of Bjerkreim in Rogaland county, Norway.  The  lake immediately south of the village of Øvrebygd.  The lake is fed by a short river from the lakes Austrumdalsvatnet and Byrkjelandsvatnet.  The river Hofreistæåna flows south out of this lake and eventually feeds into the river Bjerkreimselva.

See also
List of lakes in Norway

References

Bjerkreim
Lakes of Rogaland